William Martin (20 December 1906 – 1980) was a British water polo player who competed in the 1936 Summer Olympics.

Career 
He was part of the British team which finished eighth in the 1936 tournament. He played all seven matches.

External links
William Martin's profile at databaseOlympics.com
William Martin's profile at Sports Reference.com
Article on William Martin

1906 births
1980 deaths
British male water polo players
Olympic water polo players of Great Britain
Water polo players at the 1936 Summer Olympics